Edit mask may refer to:
 Bit mask
 Filter criteria called edit mask (for example, erasing of leading zeros and non-numerical symbols) for various computerized input fields
 The user mask associated with each process in Unix and Linux systems, which restricts the permissions that can be set on newly created files